The dollar sunfish (Lepomis marginatus) is a species of freshwater fish in the sunfish family (family Centrarchidae) of order Perciformes. It is categorized as a warm water pan-fish. Early settlers said that this species of sunfish resembled a European species they called bream. Historically it has been found along the Southern Atlantic coastal drainages from North Carolina to Florida, and west to Texas. Lepomis marginatus mainly feeds on detritus and filamentous algae as well as a few terrestrial insects (Homoptera, Hymenoptera, Etnier, and Starnes). The juvenile and mature fish do not have many predators, but the eggs in the nest are in danger of predation from a few different species of fish.

The dollar sunfish can have different breeding seasons depending on where it is located geographically. On average the dollar sunfish breeds from April to September, and in some states such as North Carolina, it breeds from May to August. They always finish breeding before the weather turns cold. These fish breed mainly on sandy substrates. "Bourgeois" males build and tend nests, court females, and care for eggs and young. The average lifespan is around 6 years, and it can grow up to a maximum of 100 mm.

Currently there are very well managed creel limits for the sunfish species. The creel limits help to protect the species from being over harvested. Other species of sunfish have been stocked in Tennessee lakes, however the dollar sunfish has yet to be stocked in any of the river drainages of Tennessee.

Geographic distribution
Historically, the dollar sunfish has been found along Southern Atlantic coastal drainages from North Carolina to Florida, and extending west to Texas. The species is most common in the southeastern United States, becoming increasingly uncommon in the western part of its range  Its Current range in North America is the Tar river in North Carolina to Brazos river in Texas in the USA; Former Mississippi Embayment in the US from western Kentucky and eastern Arkansas south to Gulf of Mexico. There have been a few records of the dollar sunfish in the Tennessee and Mississippi river drainage. However, due to its great similarity in appearance to younger specimens of the longear sunfish, L. megalotis, the distribution of L. marginatus has not been well understood in certain portions of its range.

Description
Like longear sunfish, the dark ear flap on the operculum is outlined in white. There are bright blue lines that start near the fish's mouth and extend, often discontinuously, through the operculum. The dollar sunfish typically has twelve rays on each of its pectoral fins. Its lateral line is often faintly outlined in red. The caudal fin has a shallow fork. During the spawning season, males will develop brighter coloration, with deep orange color appearing along the belly accompanied by ventral extension of the rows of iridescent scales found on the body.

Ecology
The dollar sunfish has a fairly specific diet. Due to its small gape size it cannot open its mouth large enough to eat many of the smaller larvae fish swimming in its habitat. Instead its diet consists of much smaller living organisms. McLane listed midge larvae and microcrustaceans as the major food items for dollar sunfish. Stomachs of specimens from Tennessee contained much detritus and filamentous algae and a few terrestrial insects (Homoptera, Hymenoptera), probably indicating both benthic- and surface-oriented feeding behavior. This means that the dollar sunfish feeds on living organisms both in the water and on top of the water. They seem to focus more on the easier attainable prey, which means they don't expend a lot of energy for feeding. The juveniles and adults do not have many predators other than humans. However, the eggs and larvae are at risk of predation from larger fish such as largemouth bass, other sunfish, and some invertebrates. The only real competitor the dollar sunfish might have is another species of sunfish. This is highly unlikely though because the different species of sunfish usually occupy different habitats and zones. The micro-distribution of the dollar sunfish is characterized by a pH of 7 - 7.8, and a temperature of 16 - 28 degrees Celsius (61 - 82 degrees Fahrenheit) They are often found in slow moving, small to large streams, floodplain pools, and oxbow lakes, ponds, and vegetated areas of large reservoirs. More specifically they are usually found over substrates of sand or clay overlain with silt and organic debris, and are often associated with submerged aquatic vegetation, hydrophytes, and overhanging vegetation along undercut banks.

Life history
The spawning season of the dollar sunfish occurs in the spring, from April - October at water temperatures of 16.8 - 25.6 degrees Celsius; peak spawning activity during late spring and summer. Their nests are solitary, usually adjacent to logs or some other structure; nests range from 30 – 94 cm in diameter, are 15 – 20 cm deep at center, and are usually constructed over sand. Usually the males will make the nest on a hard sand substrate. Females produce an average of 3302 eggs, with a range of 322 - 9206, depending on their body size. Individuals in Carolina are mature at age two and have a life span of six years. There are not many human induced factors influencing the life history of the dollar sunfish. However, as dams were built across the Tennessee and Mississippi river valley the populations seemed to decrease. The dams took away their natural habitat, but the dollar sunfish have adapted and can now be found in some reservoirs in West Tennessee and Florida.

Management
Laws and regulations exist to protect dollar sunfish populations. Most states enforce a creel limit, which is a limit on the maximum number of fish that a single person can catch in one day. However, there is no creel limit or size limit for the nongame pan fish in the state of Tennessee. 
The dollar sunfish is not federally or state listed as threatened or endangered. However it is rare to find dollar sunfish in its western range; the abundance has decreased a lot over the past twenty years. There is no true explanation for the decline in abundance, but some fish managers hypothesize that habitat destruction is the leading cause. In the states bordering the Gulf of Mexico, there is a large problem with habitat destruction. Hurricanes can destroy the vegetation and cover where the dollar sunfish lives. There are no true biological causes of decline of the dollar sunfish species. They are very small, and not a true target of anglers, so it is unlikely that they are overfished. An issue in the lakes with more plankton is the clarity of the water; dumping trash and stirring up the clay and silt with boats reduces the plankton populations. The water becomes too dark and no sunlight can get through to help the plankton grow, thus the dollar sunfish food supply decreases. Humans can help to protect the habitat of the dollar sunfish by managing the aquatic vegetation in the rivers and reservoirs. Also there should be larger fines for dumping trash into the rivers and lakes. However, the state conservation or resource agencies, such as TWRA, are the only groups currently working to protect this species. There are also some areas set aside in the Mississippi and Ohio Valley Plains to help conserve the populations.

References

Lepomis
Fauna of the Southeastern United States
Fish described in 1855
Freshwater fish of North America